Bratko is a given name and surname. Notable people with the name include:

 Bratko Bibič (born 1957), Slovenian accordionist
 Ekaterina Bratko (born 1993), Russian footballer
 Ivan Bratko (disambiguation), multiple people
 Nicholas Bratko (1896–1958), Greek-Catholic priest

See also
 Bratko Menaion